Ali Resideh (also Romanized as ‘Alī Resīdeh; also known as ‘Alī Sorīdeh) is a village in Kamin Rural District, in the Central District of Pasargad County, Fars Province, Iran. At the 2006 census, its population was 569, in 118 families.

References 

Populated places in Pasargad County